David  Douglas van Rooyen (born 20 November 1968) is the former Minister of Cooperative Governance and Traditional Affairs and Minister of Finance of the Republic of South Africa. He took office on 13 December 2015 and was dropped from cabinet on 27 February 2018 by  President Cyril Ramaphosa.

Political career
Van Rooyen served as an operative and soldier of the African National Congress's paramilitary force, Umkhonto we Sizwe (MK), which was integrated into the South African National Defence Force by 1994. Van Rooyen has also held various leadership positions in labour and student organisations such as the COSAS, Khutsong Student Congress, United Democratic Front and National Union of Mineworkers.

Van Rooyen also held a number of leadership positions in the ANC from 1994 to 2007, during which he was elected as mayor of Merafong City Local Municipality in the central Gauteng province. He has been a National Assembly member since 2009 for Westville Westonaria City. Van Rooyen was the party whip at the National assembly from 2009 to 2014 and the Whip on the Standing Committee on Finance and of the Economic Transformation Cluster of the National Assembly from 2014 to 2015.

Van Rooyen was appointed the Minister of Finance by President Jacob Zuma on 9 December 2015 after the removal of Nhlanhla Nene from the position. Van Rooyen was sworn in the next day, beginning his time in office. The markets reacted extremely negatively to his appointment as the South African rand dropped as much as 5.4 percent against the dollar in a single day. President Jacob Zuma reversed his decision late on 13 December 2015 when he announced that Van Rooyen would switch positions with then Minister of Cooperative Governance and Traditional Affairs, Pravin Gordhan.  Van Rooyen and Gordhan took their new positions the next day without swearing in ceremonies as they were both already ministers in the government. Van Rooyen's four-day tenure as Minister of Finance earned him the nickname "Weekend Special" in South African media.

Education
Van Rooyen attended high school at Badirile High in Khutsong, Carletonville. There, he led the student body in a youth movement, which  led him to be detained several times before he fled South Africa. He also has a MSc in Finance (Economic Policy) from the School of Oriental and African Studies of the University of London (2014) and a master's degree in Public Development and Management from the University of the Witwatersrand (2009). He also holds a certificate in investment analysis and portfolio management from UNISA, as well as several other qualifications including Diplomas in Business Management, Municipal Governance, Councillor Development, Municipal Finance, and Economic & Public Finance.

Business interests
According to the Parliament Register of Members' Interests, van Rooyen is partner or director of the following corporations
Late Bloomer Enterprise
Muziovulile Mining Projects
Sukuta Enterprise
Walinzi Protection Services
Phambili Services- A Waste Management  company established in 1996 in recognition of the growing need for sustainable integrated Waste Management solutions in the Waste Management sector in South Africa.

Private life
Van Rooyen owns a property in Suideroord, Johannesburg. He has personal interests in soccer, golf, tennis, reading and hunting.

Van Rooyen mantains a great friendship with fomer president Jacob Zuma's daughter Nonhlanhla, Carl nehuis and with various other politicians and businesses people. 

Van Rooyen lives in Baberton, Mpumalanga with his family.

References

|-

African National Congress politicians
Finance ministers of South Africa
Living people
Members of the National Assembly of South Africa
University of South Africa alumni
1968 births